HEC Liège Management School - University of Liège (in French, HEC Liège - École de gestion de l'Université de Liège and shortened as HEC Liège) is the college and graduate school of the University of Liège in the fields of economics, finance, business administration,  entrepreneurship and engineering management (business IT management, management science, operational research & business process engineering).

The Liège university school of business & economics also covers, among other things, public economics & public finance, accounting & tax, insurance & actuarial science, international business & economics, marketing, a wide range of foreign languages, information management systems, e-commerce, real estate, corporate finance, environmental-green-&-ecological management, portfolio administration, financial risk engineering & asset management, industrial economics, sport & leisure business management, financial markets & banking, leadership, tourismanagement, entrepreneurship, operations & production management, applied sciences & technological management, corporate  strategy & governance, econometrics, supply chain management & logistics, stock market analysis, HR management, ICT & business computing, digital marketing & e-business as well as not-for-profit & social development management.

The foreign languages taught are French, English, Dutch, German, Spanish, Italian, Portuguese, Japanese and Chinese. The school counts about 2.500 students among all of its programmes.

HEC Liège delivers diplomas such as BS, Master, MA, MS, MBAs, MPAs, MPhil, PhD as well as executive education diplomas (specialized complementary master's degrees) and teaching licenses of economics & business.

NB: In Belgium, universities offer academic programmes in Business Engineering. These studies are combining business administration, finance, economics with mathematics, statistics, sciences (physics, chemistry), management science and technologies for the main but also computer science as well as social science (ethics and law) and foreign languages. They are composed of a Bachelor of Science (B.S. ; 3-year track) and followed by a master's degree (M.S.) leading to the title of "Business Engineer" ("Ingénieur de gestion" in French/ "Wirtschaftsingenieur" in German / "Handelsingenieur" in Dutch / "Ingegnere Gestionale" in Italian). Graduates are granted at the end of the five (or more) years a diploma of "Master of Science in Business Engineering".
HEC Liège is member of both the AACSB and the EFMD. In 2011, the school received the EPAS accreditation from the EFMD for its MS in Management and PhD programmes.

Programmes 

HEC Liège delivers following degrees:

UNDERGRADUATE - Bachelor of Science 

BS in Economics & Management (3years / 180ECTS);
BS in Business engineering (3years / 180ECTS);
Undergraduate bridge-year in Business Management (1year / 60ECTS) for Bachelors of Commerce (B.Com. in Intl Business, Accounting, Marketing, Management Assistant, Insurance & Risk Management, e-Business, Etc.);

GRADUATE - Master's degree 

Master in Business Management (1year / 60ECTS);
Master in International Management (1year / 60ECTS / Full-English taught);
Master in European Public Administration (1year / 60ECTS / with IFAG Bulgaria);
Master in Economics (1year / 60ECTS);

SALE - Part-time Master's degree 

Master in Sales Management (forthcoming from 2019-20 / 2years / 120ECTS);

MANAGEMENT - Master of Science 

MS in Marketing & Strategic Intelligence (2years / 120 ECTS);
MS in Digital Marketing & Sales Management (2years / 120 ECTS);
MS in Management of Social Entreprises (2years / 120 ECTS);
"HEC Liège Entrepreneurs" programme - MS in Entrepreneurship (2years / 120 ECTS);
MS in General Management (2years / 120 ECTS / Part-time);

Dual Master of "Law & Business":
MS in Management / LL.M. (Master of Laws) - Double degree in law and business administration (along with the ULiège Faculty of Law, Political Science and Criminology; 3 years / 180 ECTS);
Dual Master "MOST":
MS in Management / MA in HR Management & Organization - Double degree HEC Liège / Faculty of Social Science - "Management des Systèmes Organisationnels en Transition" (forthcoming from Sept. 2019-20 / 3years / 183 ECTS);

FINANCE : Master of Science 

MS in Banking & Asset Management (2years / 120ECTS);
MS in Financial Analysis & Audit (2years / 120ECTS);
MS in Financial Engineering (2years / 120ECTS);
MS in Sustainable Performance Management, Systems & Control (2years / 120ECTS);

BUSINESS ENGINEERING - Master of Science 

MS in Financial Engineering (2years / 120ECTS);
MS in Supply Chain Management & Business Analytics (2years / 120ECTS);
MS in Intrapreneurship & Management of Innovation Projects (2years / 120ECTS);

Dual Master of "Industrial & Business Engineering":
MS in Industrial & Business Engineering - Double degree "HEC Liège / HELMo Gramme - Ingénieur industriel & de gestion" (from Sept. 2016-17 / 3years / 183ECTS);

Dual Masters of "Digital Business":
MS in Computer Science & Business Engineering - Double degree "Sciences informatiques & Ingénieur de gestion HEC Liège" (from September 2017-18 / 3years / 180ECTS);
MS in Information Technology & Business Engineering - Double degree "Ingénieur civil en informatique & Ingénieur de gestion HEC Liège" (from September 2017-18 / 3years / 183ECTS);

FINANCIAL ECONOMICS - Master of Science 

MS in Macroeconomics & Finance (2years / 120ECTS);

ECONOMICS - Master of Arts 

MA in Economics & Society: Economics of Political & Social Issues (2years / 120ECTS);
MA in Economics & Society: Competition & Innovation (2years / 120ECTS);

Advanced Master of Arts:
MA in Social Economics (1year / 60ECTS - Joint degree with UCLouvain - FOPES);

HUMAN RESOURCES - Master of Arts 

MA in Human Resource Management (2years / 120ECTS - Joint degree with the ULiège Faculty of Social Science);

Dual Master "MOST":
MS in Management / MA in HR Management & Organization - Double degree HEC Liège / Faculty of Social Science - "Management des Systèmes Organisationnels en Transition" (from Sept. 2019-20 / 3years / 183ECTS);

MBA - Master of Business Administration 

Executive Master of Business Administration - OpenBorders MBA (2years / 120ECTS);

MPA - Master of Public Administration 

MPA / MS in Management: European public management (2years / 120ECTS - Joint degree with the ULiège Faculty of Law & Political Science);

TEACHING - Master of Education in Economics & Business 

M.Ed. / Master in Management - High School teaching certificate (finalité didactique, AESS groupe sciences de gestion) (2year/120ECTS);
M.Ed. / Master in Economics - High School teaching certificate (finalité didactique, AESS groupe sciences économiques) (2year/120ECTS);
M.Ed. in Economics, Applied Economics & Business Administration - High School teaching certificate (AESS Sc. économiques et sc. de gestion) (1year/30ECTS);
M.Ed. - Higher Education, university and college teaching ability (CAPAES);

HEC LIEGE EXECUTIVE SCHOOL - Post-graduate, Advanced and Part-time degrees 

Undergraduate bridge-year in Business Management (2years/60ECTS / Part-time, evening classes);
Master in Business Management (1year / 60ECTS / Part-time, evening classes);
MS in General Management (2years / 120ECTS / Part-time, evening classes);
OpenBorders MBA (2years / 120ECTS / along with FH Aachen & the University of Hasselt);
"HEC Liège Entrepreneurs" programme (for graduates in other disciplines than business/finance/economics) - Advanced Master of Entrepreneurship (1year / 60ECTS);
Advanced MS in Financial Engineering & Risk Management (1year / 60ECTS / Part-time, evening classes);
Advanced MS in Audit, Control & Financial Accounting (1year / 60ECTS / Part-time, evening classes);
Advanced MA / LL.M. in Fiscal Law (1year / 60ECTS / joined degree with the ULg Faculty of Law & Political Science);
Online Executive Master in Management (2years / 60ECTS / along with the "Solvay Brussels School of Economics and Management - ULB" and the "Louvain School of Management - UCL");
Joint special Master in Environmental Management (with ISIL Polytechnic College, Haute Ecole de la Province de Liège);
Certificates in "Management Science", "Finance", "Analysis/Control/Audit" and "Fiscal Law";

PHD - Master of Philosophy and Doctoral programmes 

MPhil & PhD in Economics & Management (minimum 3years / 180ECTS):

- Pure Economics track;

- Applied Economical Analysis track;

- Political Economics track;

- Public Administration track;

- International Management track;

- E-Business with Digital Marketing Strategy;

- Econometrics and Operational Research track;

- Entrepreneurship track;

- Finance track;

- Marketing track;

- Accounting & Tax track;

- Business Law track;

- Corporate Strategy and Top-management Governance track;

- Operations, Supply Chain Management & Logistics track;

- HR Management track;

- IT Management & Digital Business track.

History
The Liège University School of Management (HEC Liège, formerly known as HEC-ULg) was created in 2005 by the merger of Hautes Etudes Commerciales de Liège (HEC-Liège), a private institute, created in 1898 and the Economics and Business Administration Departments (le Département d'économie et l'Ecole d'Administration des Affaires) of the University of Liège.

References

External links 
 HEC Management School - University of Liege
 HEC-ULg Alumni
 HEC-ULg Students Association

Business schools in Belgium
Universities in Belgium
Universities and colleges formed by merger in Belgium